Roman Penczek (10 December 1929 – 3 June 1987) was a Polish ice hockey player. He played for Górnik 09 Mysłowice and Górnik Katowice during his career. He also played for the Polish national team at the 1952 Winter Olympics, and the 1955 World Championships. With Górnik Katowice he won the Polish league championship in 1958.

References

External links
 

1929 births
1987 deaths
GKS Katowice (ice hockey) players
Ice hockey players at the 1952 Winter Olympics
Olympic ice hockey players of Poland
People from Mysłowice
Polish ice hockey forwards